The Kalbar rasbora (Rasbora kalbarensis) is a species of ray-finned fish in the genus Rasbora. It is known from forest streams and clear black waters of western Borneo. It grows to length  SL.

References 

Rasboras
Freshwater fish of Borneo
Endemic fauna of Borneo
Taxa named by Maurice Kottelat
Fish described in 1991